Raz, Dwa, Trzy (Polish for One, Two, Three) is a Polish music band, which joins rock, jazz and folk with contemporary poetry. It was founded in February 1990 by students of the Pedagogical College in Zielona Góra (now University of Zielona Góra). Among founders, there were: Adam Nowak (leader of the band), Grzegorz Szwalek, Jacek Olejarz and Jacek Ograbek.

In the spring of 1990, three months after foundation Raz, Dwa, Trzy won the 26th Student Festival of Music in Kraków. In the course of the time, it has become very popular and now its records are sold in hundreds of thousands.

Members
Currently, the band has five members:

 Adam Nowak – guitar, vocal
 Jacek Olejarz – drums
 Grzegorz Szwałek – accordion, clarinet, keyboard
 Jarosław Treliński – guitar, vocal
 Mirosław Kowalik – double bass, bass, vocal

Discography

Studio albums

Live albums

Compilation albums

Video albums

References

External links
 Official page of the band

Polish rock music groups
1990 establishments in Poland